The Traum MEET 3 is a compact crossover SUV produced by Zotye Auto under the Traum sub-brand for the Chinese market.

Overview
Based on the same platform as the Zotye SR7, the production car debuted in 2017. It was officially launched on the Chinese car market in April 2018, pricing starts from 79,900 yuan to 118,900 yuan. The MEET 3 is a controversial vehicle in terms of styling, because it heavily resembles the first generation Mercedes-Benz GLA-Class. The MEET 3 is powered by a 1.5 liter turbo straight-4 turbo engine mates to a 5-speed manual transmission or CVT.

References

Notes

External links

 Traum

Cars of China
Traum Meet 3
Crossover sport utility vehicles
Compact sport utility vehicles
Front-wheel-drive vehicles
Cars introduced in 2018
2010s cars